The Lifehouse Method was an Internet site where applicants could sit for an electronic musical portrait made up from data they enter into the website.  This website was the result of a collaboration between The Who's principal songwriter and composer Pete Townshend, composer Lawrence Ball and software developer Dave Snowdon.  The website was operated by Eel Pie Recording Production, Limited, a company set up in 1970 by Pete Townshend.

History
The Lifehouse Method grew out of Pete Townshend's ground-breaking 1971 futuristic composition Lifehouse.  Although Townshend originally intended Lifehouse as a multi-media, audience-participation musical production to follow The Who's Tommy, difficulties in funding and implementing the project led to its release as The Who's highly successful album Who's Next instead.  Although some of the key Lifehouse songs were left off Who's Next, the basic concept of the opus is still recognizable within the album.

In Lifehouse Townshend predicted a future wherein the population was forced inside by heavy pollution and connected in their homes to an Internet-like "Grid" through which media moguls provided programmed entertainment.  Rebels escaped this situation and gathered together to perform a live musical concert which generated a nirvana like state of universal unity.

Townshend hoped to link the audience in a way that would reflect the personalities of the audience members. To do this, he adapted VCS3 and ARP synthesizers and a quadraphonic PA to create a machine capable of generating and combining personal music themes written from computerized biographical data. He expected these thematic components would merge to form a "One Note" or "universal chord" representing the audience, and by extrapolation, all of humanity.

Although the original project proved too ambitious for the technology available in 1971, Townshend revisited the Lifehouse concept in The Who's album Who Are You and in his radio play and recording Psychoderelict.  He continued discussion of these themes in his later opus The Boy Who Heard Music.

This last work somewhat followed the Lifehouse interactive format, starting life as a novella on Townshend's Internet blog site in 2005 and 2006, where he opened an interactive discussion with readers.  Material from the novella then went into songs for The Who's album Endless Wire and into a full-length rock musical which premiered 13 July 2007, as part of Vassar College's Powerhouse Summer Theater workshop series.  Townshend also intended this story to become an animated film.

The Lifehouse Method website was discontinued in July 2008, having generated over 10,000 pieces of unique, customized music.

In January 2012 Method Music by Lawrence Ball, consisting of music created by Ball with assistance from Townshend using the Lifehouse Method, was released by Navona Records.

Idea
The Lifehouse Method is software that will create a musical portrait.  The applicants registered at the website and received a password which allowed them to create a composition.

The website musical team expected to choose some of these portraits for further development into larger compositions or songs that would be presented in a concert or concert series, with the applicant receiving a portion of any income generated.  To date, no concert has been arranged.

References

External links
The Lifehouse Method Website
Pete Townshend's Official Website
Dave Snowdon's page on the Lifehouse Method
Lawrence Ball's Official Website

Internet properties with year of establishment missing
Defunct websites
Internet properties disestablished in 2008
British music websites
Pete Townshend